Palani Bharathi or Pazhani Bharathi ( or ) is an Indian writer and lyricist who works in Tamil cinema.

Early life 
Palani Bharathi was born in Karaikudi to Sami Palaniappan, a poet, and Kamala. He has a brother and four sisters. Palaniappan was an assistant of orator/writer Kundrakudi Adigal and follower of poet Bharathidasan. When Palaniappan moved to Madras (now Chennai) with his family in search of work, he got a job in the government newspaper Tamil Arasu. As a result, Bharathi studied and grew in Chennai. He initially studied at a municipal school, and later at Ganapathi Higher Secondary School till the twelfth grade. Aspiring to become a film editor, he tried joining the M.G.R. Government Film and Television Training Institute, to no avail.

Career 
Bharathi began his career by editing articles, mainly correcting factual errors, in publications including Neerottam and Porval. Bharathi was not very interested in that job, which did not last for more than a month. Unlike his father, Bharathi liked listening to filmi songs, and aspired to become a film lyricist. He was eventually introduced to director Vikraman, and wrote a song for the film Perum Pulli (1991) which did not appear onscreen.

Style 
Bharathi prefers to write in simple, understandable language, taking inspiration from Kannadasan and Vaali. He explained, "Any literary piece is worth only if it reaches the audience and I keep it very simple. I don't believe in being verbose". He also said, "A song is no longer listened to for its meaning, it is mostly bought for the sake of rhythm and beat. Words go only to serve the musical purpose, not the semantic purpose". Palani Bharathi identifies himself as a "people's lyricist".

Controversies 
Palani Bharathi wrote slanderous articles about Malathy Maitri, a founder of the feminist literary movement Anangu, and was eventually forced to write a public apology.

Filmography

Television

Notable works 
 Neruppu Paarvaigal (collection of poems)
 Veli Nadappu
 Kadhalin Pin Kadhavu
 Mazhaippen
 Purakkal Maraintha Iravu
 Mutthangalin Pazhakkadai
 Thanimaiyil Vilayaadum Bommai
 Thanniril Vizhuntha Veyil
 Kaatrin Kaiyezhuththu

Accolades

References

External links 
 

Living people
Tamil film poets
Tamil-language lyricists
Tamil poets
Year of birth missing (living people)